Pavagada or Pavgada is a taluk in the Tumkur district in Karnataka, India. Historically it was part of the Mysore kingdom. Though it is geographically connected to Chitradurga district inside state of Karnataka, it comes under Tumkur district. Uttara Pinakini river flows into this Taluk. Pavagada Taluk falls on the border of Karnataka, hence majority of the population are bilingual speaks Kannada and Telugu. The town is famous for its fort located on the hill, Kote Anjaneya temple at the foothills and also the temple of Sri Shani Mahatma.

Agriculture
Peanut was the main crop grown in various parts of the taluk but due to constant drought, people left their agricultural works and migrated to Bangalore and various other places for livelihood.

Solar park
Pavagada Solar Park, world’s fourth largest solar park, is on a  land near Thirumani village with the capacity to generate 2,000 MW solar electricity. It's promoted by D. K. Sivakumar and G. V. Balaram.

Geography 

Demographics 
 India census, Pavagada had a population of 28,486, of which 14,299 are males while 14,187 are females as per report released by Census India 2011. Males constitute 52% of the population and females 51.50%.  Pavagada has an average literacy rate of 81.33%: male literacy is 88.33%, and female literacy is 75.36%.  In Pavagada, 10.65% of the population is under 6 years of age.

Transportation 

Pavagada is well-connected to other places in India. It has KSRTC & APSRTC buses which connect to other places of Karnataka and neighbouring Andhra Pradesh. There is a railway station being built in Pavagada under the project of Rayadurga-Tumkur Railway Line. This railway will connect Pavgada to Bangalore to Bellary via Tumkur, Madhugiri and Rayadurga.

Notable people 
 Sulagitti Narasamma – an Indian traditional midwife, known for delivering 15,000 babies.
Rangayana Raghu – actor in Kannada films and theatre
V. S. Ugrappa – politician

References 

Cities and towns in Tumkur district
Forts in Karnataka